Abbéville-la-Rivière is a commune in the Essonne department in Île-de-France in northern France.

Inhabitants are known as Abbevillois in French.

Population

See also
Communes of the Essonne department

References

Communes of Essonne